DWLV (603 AM) is a radio station owned and operated by Bicol Broadcasting System. The station's studio and transmitter are located at the BBS Bldg., Balatas Rd., Brgy. Balatas, Naga, Camarines Sur.

References

News and talk radio stations in the Philippines
Radio stations in Naga, Camarines Sur